The Kerala State Television Award for Best Actress is an honour presented annually at the Kerala State Television Awards of India to an actress for the best performance in a leading role in a Malayalam telefilm or serial. Until 1997, the awards were managed directly by the Department of Cultural Affairs, Government of Kerala. Since 1998, the Kerala State Chalachitra Academy, an autonomous non-profit organisation functioning under the Department of Cultural Affairs, has been exercising control over the awards.
The 2016 ceremony was the only occasion when the category was tied; Shafna and Sruthi Lakshmi shared the award for their performances in Sahayathrika, and Pokuveyil respectively.

Winners

See also

 List of Asian television awards

References

https://www.keralatv.in/2017/10/state-television-awards-winners

External links
 

Television awards for Best Actress
Kerala awards
Indian television awards